The Ruggeri House (Italian: Villino Ruggeri, literally "Ruggeri Cottage") is an Liberty style villa located in the town of Pesaro, the Marche, in Italy.

It was constructed between 1902 and 1907 for the pharmaceutical industrialist Oreste Ruggeri (1857–1912) and his family as a retreat. The architect was Giuseppe Brega (1877–1960).

The house is three storeys high. The front facade with the balcony has very ornate floral art nouveau stucco decorations with the monogram of the owner. The paint is in light green and white.

References 
 Andrea Speziali, Diletto e Armonia. Villeggiature marine Liberty, Comune di Pesaro, 2015.
 Andrea Speziali, Italian Liberty. L'alba del Novecento, Risguardi, Forlì 2014.
 Laura-Ingrid Paolucci, Il Villino Ruggeri in stile Liberty a Pesaro, ed. Cecchini Fausto, Pesaro 2008.
 Luisa Fontebuoni, Due momenti del Liberty a Pesaro, Belli editore, Milan 1978.

External links 
 Arteliberty.it | Villino Ruggeri

Art Nouveau architecture in Italy
Buildings and structures in Pesaro